Moses Hung-Wai Chan is a Chinese-American physicist who is Evan Pugh Professor at Pennsylvania State University. He is an alumnus of Bridgewater College and Cornell University, where he earned his Ph.D. in 1974 and was a postdoctoral associate at Duke University. He has been a professor at Penn State's University Park Campus since 1979.

Through the years, Chan's work has spanned many diverse topics. For his numerous contributions to low-temperature physics, in 1996 he shared the prestigious Fritz London Memorial prize with Carl Wieman and Eric A. Cornell. He was elected a member of the National Academy of Sciences in 2000, and a fellow of the American Academy of Arts and Sciences in 2004.

Chan is known for the experimental discovery of evidence for a new supersolid quantum state of matter, predicted theoretically in 1969 by Alexander Andreev and Ilya Liftshitz, and its subsequent refutation.  Other significant discoveries include the experimental observation of Critical Casimir effect and the experimental confirmation of 2D Ising model.

References

External links 
 His faculty page at Penn State University

1946 births
Living people
20th-century American physicists
21st-century American physicists
Bridgewater College alumni
Cornell University alumni
Duke University fellows
Fellows of the American Academy of Arts and Sciences
Fellows of the American Physical Society
Members of the United States National Academy of Sciences
Pennsylvania State University faculty
People from Xi'an
People's Republic of China emigrants to the United States
Physicists from Shaanxi
Educators from Shaanxi